To Train Up a Child is a 1994 book written by Michael and Debi Pearl, published through their non-profit organization No Greater Joy ministries. The book gives introspective detail as how to raise up a child in 'love and reverence towards one-another'; and how to 'properly instill discipline and training'.

Michael and Debi Pearl
 (born 1945) is an American independent Baptist preacher and author. After graduating from Mid-South Bible College, he worked with Union Mission in Memphis for 25 years. His 2006 graphic novel Good and Evil won the Independent Publishers' IPPY Award Bronze Medal in the Graphic Novel/Drama category in 2009 and was a 2009 ForeWord Book Award finalist. His other publications include No Greater Joy Magazine, Training Children to be Strong in Spirit, and Created to Be His Help Meet.

Michael and  married in 1971. Together they wrote To Train Up a Child, which was published in 1994. As of February 2012, the Pearls have five children and eighteen grandchildren. Their daughter Shoshanna Easling has said she had a wonderful childhood and that her parents never spoke to her in anger. Another daughter, Rebekah Pearl Anast, has said, "I think that the fact that all five of us are very happy, balanced people with great marriages and happy kids is evidence that my parents did the right thing."

No Greater Joy ministries 
No Greater Joy ministries is Michael Pearl's 501(c)(3) non-profit organization. The organization brings in between $1.5 and $1.7 million a year through product sales and donations and has sold or donated over 1.5 million copies of Pearl's books, CDs, DVDs, and other materials. The Pearls state that they do not receive royalties from the sales, and that the profits are used for ministry purposes.

Controversy
To Train Up a Child has been criticised for advocating child abuse. The book tells parents to use objects like a  diameter plastic tube to spank children and "break their will". It recommends other abusive tactics like withholding food and putting children under a cold garden hose. Its teachings are linked to the deaths of Sean Paddock, Lydia Schatz, and Hana Grace-Rose Williams. In all three cases, homeschooling parents acted on the Pearls' teachings. Michael Ramsey, the district attorney who prosecuted the Schatz case, called To Train Up a Child "an extraordinarily dangerous book for those who take it literally" and "truly an evil book". Dr. Frances Chalmers, the pediatrician who examined Hana Williams's corpse, said that "this book, while perhaps well intended, could easily be misinterpreted and could lead to what I consider significant abuse."

On his website, Pearl published responses to the deaths of Hana Williams and Lydia Schatz, listing quotes from the book that warn against abuse. Michael Pearl reacted to the death of Lydia Schatz by arguing his link to the murder of Schatz was not objectionable because Pearl's children became "entrepreneurs that pay the taxes your children will receive in entitlements." Pearl claimed that he did not bear responsibility for the murders because the size of the plastic tubing he recommends in his book is "too light to cause damage to the muscle or the bone." Pearl called the murder of Hana Williams "diametrically opposed to the philosophy of No Greater Joy Ministries and what is taught in the book." Pearl stated "The book repeatedly warns parents against abuse and emphasizes the parents' responsibility to love and properly care for their children" which includes training them for success." The Seattle Times claimed that of all the abusive methods To Train Up a Child recommends be used on children, the only one proven to have been used on Williams was spanking, which it called "clearly the heart of the book." The New York Times suggests that the Williams' other discipline tactics involved Pearl's book taken to extremes, such as the Pearls' advice that "a little fasting is good training." A witness in the trial reported that Hana Williams was subjected to "the use of a switch, cold baths, withhold food and force children outside in cold weather as punishment".

Notes

References
Citations

Bibliography

External links
 No Greater Joy ministries

1994 non-fiction books
Books about Christianity
Child abuse in the United States
Controversies in Christian literature
Christianity and children